The Wilopo Cabinet was an Indonesian cabinet that served from 1 April 1952 until 3 June 1953.

Composition

Cabinet Leadership
Prime Minister: Wilopo (Indonesian National Party – PNI)
Deputy Prime Minister: Prawoto Mangkusasmito (Masyumi Party)

Cabinet Members
Minister of Foreign Affairs ad interim: Wilopo (Indonesian National Party - PNI)
Minister of Home Affairs: Mohammad Roem (Masyumi Party)
Minister of Defense: Sultan Hamengkubuwana IX
Minister of Justice: Lukman Wiriadinata (Socialist Party of Indonesia - PSI)
Minister of Information: Arnold Mononutu (Indonesian National Party – PNI)
Minister of Finance: Sumitro Djojohadikusumo (Socialist Party of Indonesia - PSI)
Minister of Agriculture: Mohammad Sardjan (Masyumi Party)
Minister of Economic Affairs: Soemanang Soerjowinoto (Indonesian National Party – PNI)
Minister of Transport: Djuanda
Minister of Public Works and Power: Suwarto (PKRI)
Minister of Labor: Iskandar Tedjasukmana (Labour Party)
Minister of Social Affairs: Anwar Tjokroaminoto (Indonesian Islamic Union Party - PSII)
Minister of Education & Culture: Bahder Djohan
Minister of Religious Affairs: Fakih Usman (Masyumi Party)
Minister of Health: Dr. Johannes Leimena (Parkindo)
Minister of Employee Affairs: R. P. Soeroso (Parindra)

Tenure

17 October affair 

The Wilopo Cabinet's proposals to reorganize the army to conserve budgets were unpopular with the army. The Army's high command came into dispute with the parliament in what it saw as excessive civilian meddling within military affairs. After a dismissal of a pro-government officer in July 1952, the parliament began demanding a significant restructuring of armed forces leadership, and after three months tensions culminated in thousands of demonstrators mobilized by the army in Jakarta. President Sukarno managed to temper the demonstrators and assure the army officers, but refused to concede to any demands. Soon after the incident, a significant proportion of the army's high command was replaced.

Tanjung Morawa affair 

On 16 March 1953, a clash between peasant squatters and the police occurred in Tanjung Morawa, North Sumatra. The incident, known as the Tanjung Morawa affair, resulted in the downfall of the cabinet.

Changes
 Mukarto Notowidagdo (PNI) was appointed Minister of Foreign Affairs on 29 April 1952, releasing Wilopo from his dual role.
 On 11 May 1953 Social Minister Anwar Tjokroaminoto resigned and was replaced by Employee Affairs Minister Suroso. Responsibility for employee affairs was transferred to Prime Minister.
 On 2 January 1953 Defense Minister Sultan Hamengkubuwana IX resigned and Prime Minister Wilopo became ad interim Defense Minister.

References

Bibliography 
 
 

Cabinets of Indonesia
Liberal democracy period in Indonesia
1952 establishments in Indonesia
1953 disestablishments in Indonesia
Cabinets established in 1952
Cabinets disestablished in 1953